Nobody Else is a 1995 album by Take That, as well as the album's title track.

Nobody Else may also refer to:

 "Nobody Else" (Anthony Hamilton song)
"Nobody Else" (CeCe Peniston song)
"Nobody Else" (Tyrese song)
 "Nobody Else" (Tex Pistol and Rikki Morris song)
"Nobody Else" (René Froger song)

See also
...& Nobody Else